Andries Petrus van der Walt (born 19 September 1991), is a South African professional Aurillac rugby union player in the Rugby Pro D2. His regular position is lock, but has occasionally played as a flanker.

Career

Youth

He played for them at the Under-16 Grant Khomo Week in 2007, at the Under-18 Academy Week in 2008 and at the premier South African high school competition, the Under-18 Craven Week, in 2009.

Leopards

After finishing school, he went to North-West University in Potchefstroom. Two years later, he also represented the  side in the 2012 Under-21 Provincial Championship, starting all twelve of their matches as they finished sixth out of seven teams.

He made a further three starts and one appearance off the bench as the Leopards finished in fifth spot, missing out on a semi-final tie on points difference.

After the 2013, Van der Walt's former province announced that Van der Walt signed for them for the 2014 season.

SWD Eagles

He also appeared as a replacement in their quarter-final match, where his side were thoroughly outplayed, losing 15–84 to eventual champions .

The SWD Eagles then competed in the 2014 Currie Cup qualification competition, where the winner would qualify to play in the 2014 Currie Cup Premier Division.

Aurillac

Van der Walt moved to French Pro D2 side  prior to the 2018–19 season.

References

1991 births
Living people
Leopards (rugby union) players
Rugby union flankers
Rugby union locks
Rugby union players from Kimberley, Northern Cape
South African rugby union players
SWD Eagles players